Survey Park is a neighbourhood within the Santoshpur area of East Kolkata in Kolkata in the Indian state of West Bengal.

Geography

Police district
Survey Park police station is part of the East division of Kolkata Police. It is located at Ground Floor, D50/2, Near Sammilani Mahavidyalaya, East Rajapur, Santoshpur, Kolkata, West Bengal 700075.

Jadavpur, Thakurpukur, Behala, Purba Jadavpur, Tiljala, Regent Park, Metiabruz, Nadial and Kasba police stations were transferred from South 24 Parganas to Kolkata in 2011. Except Metiabruz, all the police stations were split into two. The new police stations are Parnasree, Haridevpur, Garfa, Patuli, Survey Park, Pragati Maidan, Bansdroni and Rajabagan.

Transport
Jyotirindra Nath Nandi metro station and Satyajit Ray metro station, under construction on the  Kavi Subhas-Biman Bandar route (Kolkata Metro Line 6), would serve Survey Park, Santoshpur and Ajoy Nagar areas lying close to the E.M. Bypass section of the city.

Sports
Kishore Bharati Krirangan, also called Jadavpur Stadium, is a multi-purpose sports facility, used mainly for football matches. It has a seating capacity of 12,000. 
 It is currently under renovation.

References

External links

Neighbourhoods in Kolkata